The N-330 is a highway in Aragon, Spain.  It forms part of European Route E7.

It connects with France at the Tunnel of Somport (12 km) with Huesca.  It then becomes the Autovía A-23 to Zaragoza.  It heads south to Daroca, where it becomes the N-234.  

The road emerges again south of Teruel following the Rio Turia.  The N-420 branches west in the Rincón de Valencia rising to over 1,000m.  It then runs south  to Utiel and the Autovía A-3 in the province of Valencia.  At Requena the road heads south again into the Sierra Martés with a junction with the N-322 and then crosses the Puerto de Cruz de Confrentes and then down to the Rio Xúquer.  Thereafter it passes the Reserva Nacional de Muela de Cortes and a series of olive groves to Almansa and the Autovía A-31.

Transport in Aragon
Transport in the Valencian Community
National roads in Spain